Trope or tropes may refer to:

Arts, entertainment, and media
 Trope (cinema), a cinematic convention for conveying a concept
 Trope (literature), a figure of speech or common literary device
 Trope (music), any of a variety of different things in medieval and modern music
 Fantasy tropes, elements of the fantasy genre
 TV Tropes, a wiki for conventions and devices found within creative works

Philosophy and religion
 Trope (philosophy), figurative and metaphorical language and various other technical senses
 Tropes, qualities or properties in formal ontology in philosophy
 Trope, a musical motif associated with cantillation, chanting of readings from the Hebrew Bible

Science and technology
 Trope (mathematics), an archaic geometry term for a tangent line or plane
 Tropidophiidae or tropes, a dwarf boa
 Tropes, part of the desktop search engine software Tropes  Zoom

Other uses
 Michael Trope (born 1951), American trial lawyer and former sports agent

See also

 Meme